Nisportino is a village in Tuscany, central Italy, administratively a frazione of the comune of Rio, province of Livorno. At the time of the 2011 census, its population was 2.

External links 
 

Frazioni of Rio, Italy